Zim Zimma is a song by English rapper Sneakbo. The song was released in the United Kingdom on 4 November 2012 by Play Hard Records and reached number 35 on the UK Singles Chart.

Music video
A music video to accompany the release of "Zim Zimma" was first released onto YouTube on 20 September 2012 at a total length of three minutes and thirty nine seconds.

Track listing

Chart performance

Release history

References 

Sneakbo songs
2012 singles
2012 songs